The Annexation Bill of 1866 was a bill introduced on July 2, 1866, but never passed in the United States House of Representatives.  It called for the annexation of British North America and the admission of its provinces as states and territories in the Union.  The bill was sent to committee but never came back, was never voted upon, and did not become law.  The bill never came to the United States Senate.

The bill authorized the President of the United States to, subject to the agreement of the governments of the British provinces, "publish by proclamation that, from the date thereof, the States of Nova Scotia, New Brunswick, Canada East, and Canada West, and the Territories of Selkirk, Saskatchewan, and Columbia, with limits and rights as by the act defined, are constituted and admitted as States and Territories of the United States of America."  It provided for the admission of all the colonies and the purchase of the Hudson's Bay Company's lands for $10,000,000. The American government would assume public lands and state-owned bonds and the right to levy taxes and, in return, would take over provincial debts to the total of $85,700,000 and give an annual subsidy of $1,646,000 to the new states. In addition, the United States would connect Canada with the Maritimes by rail and spend $50,000,000 to complete and improve the colonial canal system.

The bill was introduced by Congressman Nathaniel Prentice Banks, a representative from Massachusetts. It was intended to appeal to Irish Americans who supported the Fenian Movement and were aggressively hostile to Britain. Indeed, much of American public opinion at the time was hostile because of Britain's perceived support for the Confederacy during the American Civil War.  There was no serious effort in Washington to annex Canada.

Proposed states and territories

If successful, the Annexation Bill would have created four states and three territories from what is today Canada, listed below. Additionally, most of the Arctic Archipelago and parts of the Canadian mainland would have become unorganized territory.

 New Brunswick. Modern-day New Brunswick
 Nova Scotia. Modern-day Nova Scotia and Prince Edward Island
 Canada East. Modern-day Quebec, Newfoundland and Labrador, and part of modern-day northern Ontario
 Canada West. Modern-day southern Ontario, and part of modern-day northern Ontario.
 Selkirk Territory. Modern-day Manitoba, and parts of modern-day northwestern Ontario, Nunavut, Saskatchewan and the Northwest Territories
 Saskatchewan Territory. Modern-day Alberta, and parts of modern-day Saskatchewan, British Columbia, the Northwest Territories and Yukon.
 Columbia Territory. The part of modern-day British Columbia and Yukon west of the Rocky Mountains.

See also 
Annexationist movements of Canada
Continentalism
Expansionism
Fenian Raids
Hunter Patriots
Manifest Destiny
Oregon boundary dispute

Notes

References
 Fred H. Harrington. Fighting Politician: Major General N. P. Banks (Philadelphia, 1948), pp 178–79. 
 Donald Frederic Warner; The Idea of Continental Union: Agitation for the Annexation of Canada to the United States, 1849-1893 University of Kentucky Press. 1960.

External links
Actual text, from United States Library of Congress
Text of the bill, from Collections Canada

1866 in American law
Canada–United States relations
Political history of Canada
United States proposed federal legislation
Proposed states and territories of the United States
1866 in international relations
Annexation